Hjertestarter is the fifth studio album by the Danish band Nephew. It was released on 2 November 2012, and received Platinum in December of the same year.

In 2013 a duet between Nephew and Marie Key was released; a remake of the song "Gå med dig"

Track listing

References 

Nephew (band) albums